In mathematics, cocompact embeddings are embeddings of normed vector spaces possessing a certain property similar to but weaker than compactness. Cocompactness has been in use in mathematical analysis since the 1980s, without being referred to by any name (Lemma 6),(Lemma 2.5),(Theorem 1), or by ad-hoc monikers such as vanishing lemma or inverse embedding.

Cocompactness property allows to verify convergence of sequences, based on translational or scaling invariance in the problem, and is usually considered in the context of Sobolev spaces. The term cocompact embedding is inspired by the notion of cocompact topological space.

Definitions 
Let   be a group of isometries on a normed vector space  . One says that a sequence  converges to  -weakly, if  for every sequence ,  the sequence  is weakly convergent to zero.

An elementary example: cocompactness for  
Embedding of the space  into itself is cocompact relative to the group  of shifts . In particular one may choose  such that
, which implies that 

Some known embeddings that are cocompact but not compact 
 Embeddings of Sobolev space in the Moser–Trudinger case into the corresponding Orlicz space.
 Embeddings of Besov and Triebel–Lizorkin spaces.
 Embeddings of Strichartz spaces.

References

Compactness (mathematics)
Convergence (mathematics)
Functional analysis
General topology
Nonlinear functional analysis
Normed spaces